Nadie sale vivo de aquí, is the fourth studio album by Argentine musician Andrés Calamaro, released in 1989.

Track listing

References 

1989 albums
Andrés Calamaro albums